The Loser Takes It All is a 2002 Greek dramatic experimental independent underground art film, the seventh feature film directed by Nikos Nikolaidis. The film, produced by the Greek Film Center and Greek Television ET-1, is the last part of the "Years of Cholera" trilogy beginning with The Wretches Are Still Singing (1979) and Sweet Bunch (1983) which deals with the last decades of the twentieth century. Production of the film was finished by September 2002. The film was first screened at the Thessaloniki International Film Festival on 15 November 2002 and its theatrical release began on 31 January 2003. The film received the Best Director Award and Kostas Gikas received the Best Cinematographer Award for it at the Thessaloniki International Film Festival's Greek State Film Awards in November 2002.

Plot
The story revolves around five characters: a fortysomething, the "Man," who has memories from the "years of cholera;" an alcoholic woman, Odetti, who goes by the pseudonym of "Madame Raspberry;" a Senegalese stripper named Mandali; the "Little Guy," a guitar player and music lover; and Elsa, the protagonist's ex-girlfriend who is now a barwoman. The characters meet in order to fulfill their longstanding dream: leaving the city for an exotic island on a journey of no return. Thus they get involved with the dark world of the night.

Crew
Director and Writer: Nikos Nikolaidis
Producer: Nikos Nikolaidis
Music and Soundtrack: Giannis Aggelakas and Simeon Nikolaidis
Cinematographer: Kostas Gikas
Editor: Giorgos Triandafyllou
Set Decorator and Costume Designer: Marie-Louise Bartholomew
Makeup Artist: Katerina Oikonomidoy
Sound: Antonis Samaras
Sound Re-Recording Mixer: Kostas Varybopiotis

Cast
Giannis Aggelakas as Man
Simeon Nikolaidis as Little Guy
Jenny Kitseli as Odetti
Ifigenia Asteriadi as Elsa
Louise Attah as Mandali
Ioanna Pappa as Melissa
Savva Loumi as Blonde
Melissa Stoili as Agni
Maro Mavri as Television Woman
Christos Houliaras as Cameraman
George Houliaras as First Dealer
Kostas Katsikis
Dimitris Katsimanis as Short Guy
Themis Katz as Second Dealer
Stefanos Lazarinos as Third Dealer
Grigoris Pimenidis as Detective
Notis Pitsilos as Pawnbroker
Takis Tsagaris as "El Dorado" Boss
Michele Valley as Dead Mother

Soundtrack
The film's soundtrack contains the following songs:

"It's a Wonderful World" by Simeon Nikolaidis
"Space in Time" by Simeon Nikolaidis
"Into Town" by Simeon Nikolaidis

The soundtrack was released in 2003 by the company Hitch Hyke Records and includes twenty-eight pieces (mostly instrumental), including the song "The Loser Takes It All" ( tr. "O chamenos ta pairnei ola") sung by Giannis Aggelakas. It was later reissued by Aggelakas' record label All Together Now.

References

Further reading
Νίκος Γεωργίου Νικολαΐδης, Ο χαμένος τα παίρνει όλα: Σενάριο, Αθήνα: Εκδόσεις Αιγόκερως, 2003, 143 σελίδες.

External links
The Loser Takes It All at Nikos Nikolaidis (Film Director/Writer/Producer)

The Loser Takes It All at the Greek Film Archive Film Museum: Home Page, Digital Archives, Filmography

The Loser Takes It All at The New York Times Movies
Ο χαμένος τα παίρνει όλα at 5 Books, 6 Films, and... Nikos Nikolaidis: Films 

2000s avant-garde and experimental films
2000s business films
2002 drama films
2002 independent films
2000s drama road movies
2002 films
Greek drama films
Greek-language films
Films directed by Nikos Nikolaidis
Films about alcoholism
Films about cities
Films about death
Films about food and drink
Films about immigration
Films about music and musicians
Films about psychiatry
Films about race and ethnicity
Films about sexuality
Films about television
Films set in Greece
Films set on islands
Films shot in Greece